Dieter Berg (born 11 June 1966) is a German former boxer. He competed in the men's bantamweight event at the 1992 Summer Olympics.

References

External links
 

1966 births
Living people
German male boxers
Olympic boxers of Germany
Boxers at the 1992 Summer Olympics
People from Hagenow
Bantamweight boxers
Sportspeople from Mecklenburg-Western Pomerania